Rosa Maria Calles (born October 15, 1949) is an Hispanic American artist, playwright, producer, and director.

Career

Writing 
Calles' writing has been published in La Confluencia Magazine, Fiesta USA by Penguin Books, and the Victorian Gazette.

In 2000, she wrote, directed, and produced Cuento de La Llorona/Tale of the Wailing Woman, a two-act play.

Art 
Calles' work has been shown at the Mexican American Museum in San Francisco, California; San Juan, Puerto Rico, Los Angeles, California; and several other major US cities. Her work is in the permanent collections of the Museum of International Folk Art, the Millicent Rogers Museum, and the Museum of Heritage and Arts all in New Mexico, and the Sacred Arts Museum in Eureka Springs, Arkansas. In 1993 Rosa Maria Calles was selected for inclusion by the Museum of International Folk Art in Santa Fe, New Mexico, to participate in "The Art of the Santera," a traveling show that toured American cities for two years.

Personal life 
In 1972, Calles married author Ray John de Aragon with whom she has four children.

References

Anderson-Cozen, Kera.  "Artists of New Mexico."  Pan American Publishing, Las Vegas, New Mexico, 1986.
Anderson, Kera L.  "Rosa Maria Calles."  Vegas Victorian Gazette, September, 1987.
Blaylock, Eva.  "Ghostly Fable Plays Out on Stage."  IQ Magazine, October, 2007.
Cervantes, Norma.  "La Llorona:  A Well-Produced, New Spin on Popular New Mexico Tale."  El Defensor Chieftain, November, 2005.
Cervantes, Norma.  "La Llorona on Macey Stage is Haunting."  El Defensor Chieftain, November, 2005.
Collado, Lizette.  "Vuelve La Llorona, Una Tradición en el Teatro de Nuevo México."  Octubre de 2006.
Della Flora, Anthony.  "La Llorona Fable Comes to Life in Musical."  Albuquerque Journal, October, 2001.
Dendinger, Julia M.  "Classic Tale of La Llorona Offers Haunting Message."  Caliente-Arts & Entertainment, October, 2006.
Garcia, Clara.  "Rosa Maria Calles Making Waves in Art World."  Valencia News Bulletin, January, 2002.
Henao, Juliana.  "El Grito de La Llorona."  La Voz de Nuevo México, Octubre, 2005.
Mondragón, Roberto.  "Rosa María Calles:  Artista."  Aspectos Culturales Amigos, Noviembre, 1995.
Noriega, Sat.  "The Wailing Ghost of La Llorona On Stage."  Alamogordo Daily News, April, 2004.
Pacheco, Rosalia.  "Celebración-Celebrating the Arts."  El Puente, National Hispanic Cultural Center, Summer/Fall 1998.
Parhard, Elisa.  New Mexico, A Guide for the Eyes.  Eyemuse Books, Los Angeles, California, 2009.
Roath, Guen.  "La Llorona-Tome Writer's Stage Rendition of New Mexico's Most Famous Ghost."  Steppin Out, October/November, 2006.
Russell, Inez.  "La Llorona:  A Legend Takes the Stage."  New Mexico Magazine, October, 2009.
Sanchez, Aurelio.  "Llorona Tale Surfaces at Kimo."  Albuquerque Journal, October, 2007.
Sanchez, Aurelio.  "Enduring Spirits."  Venue-Albuquerque Journal, October, 2008.
Sandlin, Scott.  "Rosa Maria Calles Exhibits at Spanish History Museum."  Albuquerque Tribune, January, 1987.
Santillanes, Millie.  "Rosa María Calles."  Nuestras Mujeres, El Norte Publications/Academia; Albuquerque, New Mexico, 1992.
Vander Meer, Sharon.  "Calles Featured at Burris Art Gallery."  Las Vegas Optic, February, 1993.
Vargas-Mangano, Rocio.  "El cuento de La Llorona Toma Vida."  El Hispano News, Octubre del 2001.
Wilson, Trecia A.  "A Family History Lives Through Its Art."  Las Vegas Optic, October, 2000.

1949 births
20th-century American dramatists and playwrights
Living people
People from New Mexico